Matej Slávik (born 5 August 1994) is a Slovak football goalkeeper who currently plays for MŠK Žilina, on loan from MŠK Považská Bystrica.

Club career

DAC Dunajská Streda
Slávik made his professional Fortuna Liga debut for Dunajská Streda against Spartak Trnava on 23 October 2016.

References

External links
 FC DAC 1904 Dunajská Streda profile
 
 Eurofotbal profile
 Futbalnet profile

1994 births
Living people
Slovak footballers
Slovak expatriate footballers
Association football goalkeepers
FK Dubnica players
FC DAC 1904 Dunajská Streda players
KFC Komárno players
FC Silon Táborsko players
MŠK Považská Bystrica (football) players
MŠK Žilina players
People from Ilava
Sportspeople from the Trenčín Region
Slovak Super Liga players
2. Liga (Slovakia) players
Czech National Football League players
Slovak expatriate sportspeople in the Czech Republic
Expatriate footballers in the Czech Republic